Chepo F.C. was a Panamanian football team playing at the Liga Panameña de Fútbol. The team folded mid 2016. It was based in Chepo.

Chepo was known for its youth system of whom have emerged many future promises of Panamanian football, among those are: Armando Gun, Gabriel Torres, Eduardo Jiménez, José Calderón and Román Torres, all of whom have represented Panama.

History

Proyecto 2000
Chepo FC was founded in 1999 under the name of Proyecto 2000, where it gathered young players from around the country aspiring to win a ticket to the Liga Panameña de Fútbol one day. They started playing in the Liga Distritorial de Fútbol de Panamá (Lidifutpa).

In 2000 the team was renamed Chepo FC due to expansion and participated in 2003 in Primera A.

In 2006 the team gained promotion from Primera A to the Liga Panameña de Fútbol after beating Pan de Azúcar 2–1. They have not been very successful at the highest level and only reached the semi-finals of the 2008 Apertura season.

By May 2016 main sponsor retired support causing the team to fold, it was replaced by Liga Nacional de Ascenso runner-up S.D. Atlético Veragüense.

Honours
Primera A: 1
2006

Copa Rommel Fernández: 1
2003

Year-by-year results

Liga Panameña de Fútbol

Players

Current squad
 For Clausura 2016

Retired numbers

77 –  Jonathan Rodríguez, midfielder, 2006–09 (posthumous honour)

Notable players

Historical list of coaches

 Felipe Fuentes (2005–09)
 Víctor René Mendieta (2009–10)
 Cesar Morales and Frank Lozada (April 2010–June 10)
 Mike Stump (June 2010–June 11)
 Felipe Fuentes (2011)
 Mike Stump (Jan 2012–April 13)
 Felipe Fuentes (July 2013–)
 Jorge Santos (June 2014–)

References

External links
 Official website

Football clubs in Panama
Association football clubs established in 1999
Defunct football clubs in Panama
1999 establishments in Panama